East Agoura is a district on the eastern side of the city of Agoura Hills, located on the city's, in western Los Angeles County, California. The city of Oak Park is on the north

East Agoura is the most dense of the suburban city's districts, as the area contains a mix of apartment buildings and large offices as a result of construction in the 1990s.

This district is located immediately south of the residential and more rural Old Agoura, and it is sometimes referred to as part of Old Agoura as both are north of the 101−Ventura Freeway in eastern Agoura Hills.  The least dense area of the district is located near Agoura High School, surrounding Chumash Park, a large, quiet suburban park within walking distance from Downtown.

External links
 Chumash Park

Neighborhoods in Agoura Hills, California